Cytharomorula springsteeni is a species of sea snail, a marine gastropod mollusk in the family Muricidae, the murex snails or rock snails.

Description

Distribution
This marine species occurs off the Philippines and New Caledonia.

References

 Houart R. (1995["1994"]) The Ergalataxinae (Gastropoda, Muricidae) from the New Caledonia region with some comments on the subfamily and the description of thirteen new species from the Indo-West Pacific. Bulletin du Muséum National d'Histoire Naturelle, Paris, ser. 4, 16(A, 2-4): 245-297.
Description of new genera and new species of Ergalataxinae (Gastropoda: Muricidae). Novapex 20(HS 12): 1-52

Gastropods described in 1995
Cytharomorula